National Penitentiary Institute may refer to:

Federal Penitentiary Service of Argentina (Servicio Penitenciario Federal, SPF)
National Penitentiary Institute of Peru (Instituto Nacional Penitenciario, INPE)
National Penitentiary and Prison Institute of Colombia (Instituto Nacional Penitenciario y Carcelario, INPEC)
For other prison systems, see :Category: Prison and correctional agencies